National Tertiary Route 923, or just Route 923 (or ) is a National Road Route of Costa Rica, located in the Guanacaste province.

Description
In Guanacaste province the route covers Bagaces canton (Bagaces district), Cañas canton (Cañas, Bebedero districts).

References

Highways in Costa Rica